Mirtoviči (in older sources also Mrtovec) is a small settlement on the left bank of the Kolpa River in the Municipality of Osilnica in southern Slovenia. The entire municipality is part of the traditional region of Lower Carniola and is now included in the Southeast Slovenia Statistical Region.

References

External links
Mirtoviči on Geopedia

Populated places in the Municipality of Osilnica